"Medo de sentir" (English: "Afraid of feeling", literally "Fear of feeling") is a song performed by Portuguese singer Elisa Silva and written by Portuguese singer-songwriter Marta Carvalho. It would have represented Portugal in the Eurovision Song Contest 2020 in Rotterdam, Netherlands.

Eurovision Song Contest

The song was selected to represent Portugal in the Eurovision Song Contest 2020, after Elisa Silva was selected through Festival da Canção 2020, the music competition that selects Portugal's entries for the Eurovision Song Contest. On 28 January 2020, a special allocation draw was held which placed each country into one of the two semi-finals, as well as which half of the show they would perform in. Portugal was placed into the second semi-final, set to be held on 14 May 2020, and was scheduled to perform in the second half of the show.

References

2020 singles
2020 songs
Eurovision songs of 2020
Eurovision songs of Portugal
Portuguese songs
Portuguese-language songs